The Star (stylized in all caps) is the first studio album of Japanese boy group JO1, formed through the reality competition show Produce 101 Japan. Consisting of songs from their previous EP singles Protostar and Stargazer, the album was released by Lapone Entertainment into four different editions on November 25, 2020, with "Shine a Light" as the promotional single. It features participation of South Korean producers and producing teams, such as KCKT, 13, Hui, Yoske, and others.

To promote the album, the group performed in several awards and year-end music shows along with two solo performances by member Junki Kono on music YouTube channel The First Take. The group also held their first live streaming concerts titled Starlight and Starlight Deluxe, held on December 19, 2020, and February 20, 2021, respectively. The concerts amassed a total of more than 240,000 viewers from 40 countries and regions.
 
The album debuted at number two on Oricon Albums Chart and Billboard Japan Hot Albums only behind BTS's Be. It also received a Gold certification from the Recording Industry Association of Japan (RIAJ) for over 100,000 units in shipments.

Background and release
On October 5, 2020, seven months after their debut, JO1 held a press conference at the Esports Ginza Studio in Tokyo to announce the release of their first studio album The Star and first online concert titled Starlight. The concept photos for the album were released on the same day and showed the members in light-colored stars-studded costumes, expressing their "shining self" to continue the concept of their previous release.

The album was released on November 25 into four different editions, consisting of seven new songs and all songs from their previous EP singles, Protostar and Stargazer. The three limited editions (Red, Blue, Green) feature 15 tracks, including "Starlight", "Shine a Light", and another new song that is different for each edition. The limited edition Red comes with a bonus DVD featuring a talk segment with the members titled JO1 Party. The limited edition Green and Blue come with a photo book and an accordion card, respectively. The normal edition comes with a solo poster and features 19 tracks, including all new songs in the limited editions and JO1 version of Produce 101 Japan "Yancha Boy Yancha Girl" and "Happy Merry Christmas". It is also available in digital format for streaming and digital download.

Promotion
To commemorate the album's release, JO1 held a live streaming event on their official YouTube channel on the release day. They were also featured in a special program on Music On! TV and released their second official Line stickers set.

JO1 promoted the album by performing "Shine a Light" in several television shows, including the 2020 FNS Music Festival held on December 2, 2020. They also performed the song along with "Infinity" at the 2020 MTV Video Music Awards Japan and the 2020 Mnet Asian Music Awards (MAMA) where they received the Rising Star Award and the Best New Asian Artist, respectively. On December 4, member Junki Kono performed an acoustic solo version of "Infinity" on the music YouTube channel The First Take. Due to the exposure from his appearance on the channel as well as the group's performances on the FNS Music Festival and MAMA, four songs from the album, "Infinity", "Shine a Light", "Monstar" and "Oh-Eh-Oh", reappeared in the top 100 rank of Oricon's YouTube Chart of the week. Kono's solo performances of "Infinity" and "Voice" were subsequently released as digital songs on January 13, 2021. On February 25, JO1 did their first performance in South Korea by appearing on M Countdown. They also performed songs from the album as the headliner for Tokyo Girls Collection for the second time in a row on February 28. To further celebrate the album's release, JO1 held a special exhibition titled JO1 Museum: The Star sequentially at six HMV Museums nationwide, starting from November 3 to December 6, 2020.

Singles
The album's lead single Protostar was released on March 4, 2020, which is also the group's debut release. The single was released as an extended play and features "Infinity" as the lead track. The single reached number one on the Oricon Singles Chart and Billboard Japan Hot 100, and received a Platinum certification by the RIAJ. Earning an estimate of 640 million yen, the single helped JO1 becoming the second best-selling new artist on the Oricon chart for the first half of 2020.

Stargazer was released as the album's second single on August 26, 2020. The single continued the group's number one position on the Oricon and Billboard Japan charts. Released with a concept about teenagers in distress, the music video of its lead track "Oh-Eh-Oh" features members of JO1 fighting against a mysterious group as high school students. Hui from the South Korean boy group Pentagon co-produced the song.

The music video of the promotional single "Shine a Light" was released on November 10. Directed by Yasuhiro Arafune, the concept of the music video was dubbed as "intersecting space-time". It depicts the members roaming around the same intersection in a fictional city, separated by time and era, with shining light as the only connection between the different timelines. The song peaked at number fifty-eight on the Japan Hot 100.

Concerts

JO1 1st Live Streaming Concert "Starlight"

JO1 1st Live Streaming Concert "Starlight" is a virtual pay-per-view concert held on December 19, 2020, via . Lasting for two hours and twenty minutes, the concert also consisted of talk and game segments. The concert amassed an estimate of 120,000 viewers from 30 countries and regions besides Japan, such as the United States, Australia, China, South Korea, and Indonesia. The concert was broadcast on TBS' cable television channel  on January 31, 2021, with exclusive behind-the-scenes footage and interview with the members.

The set list for the show was the following:
 "Shine a Light"
 "Monstar"
 "Kungchikita" (JO1 ver.)
 "GrandMaster" (JO1 ver.)
 "Happy Merry Christmas" (JO1 ver.)
 "Yancha Boy Yancha Girl" (JO1 ver.)
 "Go"
 "Oh-Eh-Oh"
 "Tsukame (It's Coming)"
Encore
 "Be With You"
 "Infinity"

JO1 Live Streaming Concert "Starlight Deluxe"

JO1 Live Streaming Concert "Starlight Deluxe" is the second virtual concert by JO1 and was held on February 20, 2021. Unlike the first concert, it was live-streamed from Paju, South Korea.  With a concept of traveling in space with the group, the concert featured a longer set list, a series of spacecraft-themed VCRs, and a live band. According to news reports, the concert was viewed by more than 120,000 people from 40 countries and regions, including Japan, the United States, Australia, South Korea, Thailand, India, and France. Band version of "Oh-Eh-Oh" and "Grandmaster" were later released as digital singles on August 8, 2021.

The set list for the show was the following:
 "Shine a Light"
 "Monstar"
 "Running"
 "Go"
 "Yancha Boy Yancha Girl" (JO1 ver.)
 "My Friends"
 "Young" (JO1 ver.) 
 "Voice"
 "Be With You"
 "Tsutaerareru Nara"
 "Safety Zone"
 "So What"
 "Grandmaster" (Band ver.) 
 "Oh-Eh-Oh" (Band ver.)
Encore
 "Tsukame (It's Coming)"
 "Infinity"

Critical reception
Azusa Takahashi of  praised the group's rapid growth that is evident throughout The Star, especially in singing. She also mentioned that one of the album's charms is the amount of possibility shown from the wide range of tastes in the songs. Although some tracks have been performed in Produce 101 Japan, she described those songs as "cohesive while retaining the freshness of the time."  To close her review, Takahashi stated the album is good in showing "factors that makeup JO1 as an artist", which are the bond between members, the "spices" found in the songs thanks to the uniqueness of the members, and gratitude to their fans.

Commercial performance
After its release, The Star debuted at number one on the Oricon Daily Albums Chart with an estimate of 114,560 copies sold. It eventually ranked at number two on the weekly chart after BTS' album Be with 158,333 copies sold and received a Gold certification from the RIAJ. The album also ranked at number two on Billboard Japan Hot Albums and number one on the sales component chart on the week of its release. The commercial success of the album also put JO1 in third place for Billboard Japan Artist 100 of the week, which was also the chart's inaugural week. By the end of 2020, the album ranked at number twenty-one on the 2020 Oricon Annual Ranking with 173,753 physical copies sold. Due to its release date didn't fall in the aggregation period in 2020, The Star was included on Billboard Japan album sales chart for the first half of 2021 at number ten with 195,255 physical copies sold, and eventually ranked twenty-second on their 2021 Year-End Hot Albums.

Track listing
"Starlight", "Shine a Light" and "My Friends" are common track 1, 2 and 15, respectively, for all limited editions.

Credits and personnel 
Credits are adapted from the album's liner notes. Track listing is based on The Star normal edition.

Musicians 

 JO1 – vocals 
 Yoske – chorus 
 Lee Min-young (Eastwest) – bass , drum , computer programming , guitar , piano 
 Yeul (1by1) – piano , computer programming 
 Mook – chorus 
 Score (13) – piano , drum 
 Esbee – chorus , piano , drum 
 Megatone (13) – guitar , bass 
 Yhanael – Japanese translation 
 KZ – MIDI programming , synthesizer , drum , bass , chorus , electric piano , guitar 
 B.O – chorus 
 Nthonious – MIDI programming , synthesizer , drum , bass , guitar 
 Kim Seung-soo – MIDI programming , synthesizer , drum , bass 
 Kim Hye-kwang – chorus , vocal editing 
 Who's H – vocal editing 
 Young Jay (KCKT) – bass , chorus , drum 
 Buggy (KCKT) – drum , chorus , keyboard , bass , synthesizer 
 Ven (KCKT) – synthesizer , chorus , guitar , bass 
 Teito (KCKT) – chorus , vocal tuning , synthesizer , keyboard , bass , drum 
 Kohway (KCKT) – chorus 
 Minit – acoustic piano , synthesizer , electric guitar , bass , drum , string , sound effect 
 Airair – acoustic piano , synthesizer , electric guitar , bass , drum , string , sound effect 
 Lazier – chorus 
 Onestar (Monotree) – chorus 
 Ryan S. Jhun – producing , vocal directing 
 Andrew Choi – vocal directing , background vocals 
 Eunsol (1008) – producing , keyboard , bass , drum 
 Seo Yi-sung – producing , drum 
 Sun – tune 
 Dono – chorus 
 Coach – guitar , chorus 
 Sendo – bass 
 Yuki – chorus 
 Ji Seung-gyu – chorus 
 Bae Jae-seok (Solcire) – chorus , digital editing & tuning 
 Jkun – guitar 
 Ouow – producing 
 Nile Lee – string arranging 
 Yundak – piano , drum 
 Last P – piano , drum 
 Lee Tae-wook – guitar 
 Yinail – string arrangement 
 On The String – string

Technicals 

 Osamu Shiota – recording 
 Kim Min–hee – recording 
 Jang Woo-young – recording 
 Min Sung-su – recording 
 Eugene Kwon – recording 
 Kwon Yoo-jin – recording 
 Gu Jong-pil – mixing 
 Master Key – mixing 
 Teito (KCKT) – mixing , asst. mixing 
 Hong Sung-joon – mixing 
 Jennifer Hong – asst. mixing 
 Jeung Eun-kyung – mixing 
 Park Seong-min – mixing 
 Coach & Sendo – mixing 
 Ko Hyun-jeong – mixing 
 Lee Gun-ho – mixing 
 Kwon Nam-woo – mastering 
 Jang Seung-ho – asst. mastering

Locations

Recording
 Sound Valley
 Doobdooob Studio
 821 Sound
 Studio A-tone
 Studio Fine

Mixing
 Klang Studio
 Ingrid Studio
 Mesunshine
 Studio C
 Koko Sound Studio
 Team N Genius
 Gaenari Sound
 821 Sound

Mastering
 821 Sound

Vocal editing
 Kwang Sound

Visual

 Cho Dae-yong (Rainbowbus) – album design
 Shin Hyo jin (Rainbowbus) – album design
 Shim Jee-hee (Rainbowbus) – album design
 Min In-hong – style director
 Takashi Kamei – photographer
 VITA – retouch
 LiNK-UP – retouch
 Shohei Fujinaga – stylist
 Cheeks – hair & make–up
 Tamzin (Choi Young-joon) – choreography 
 Sorr (AP) – choreography 
 You Seung-hyun – choreography

Charts

Weekly charts

Monthly charts

Year-end charts

Certifications

Release history

References 

JO1 albums
2020 albums
Japanese-language albums